Tyrrel Bay (PB-01) is a United States-built Guardian-class patrol boat ordered for the Grenadan Coast Guard. She was built for Grenada at the US's request and entered service in November 1984. The builder was Lantana Boatyard and the ship was put together at Lantana, Florida. The Tyrrel Bay has an aluminum hull construction, and was overhauled in 1995. She was scuttled and sunk as a dive site off the coast of Grenada in 2018

References
 Wertheim, Eric, The Naval Institute Guide to Combat Fleets of the World, 2005–2006; Their Ships, Aircraft, and Systems. US Naval Institute Press, Annapolis, Maryland. 2005.

Patrol vessels of the Coast Guard of Grenada
1984 ships